Pasir Pinji is a state constituency in Perak, Malaysia. It is located in the Ipoh Barat federal constituency and is currently represented in the Perak State Legislative Assembly by Lee Chuan How from DAP.

Demographics

History

Polling districts 
According to the federal gazette issued on 31 October 2022, the Pasir Pinji constituency is divided into 11 polling districts.

Representation history

Election Results

References

External links

Perak state constituencies